
The Heffron ministry (1959–1962) or First Heffron ministry was the 59th ministry of the New South Wales Government, and was led by the 30th Premier, Bob Heffron, of the Labor Party. The ministry was the first of two consecutive occasions when the Government was led by Heffron, as Premier.

Heffron was first elected to the New South Wales Legislative Assembly in 1930 and served continuously until 1968, representing the seats of Botany and Maroubra. Having served continuously as Minister for Emergency Services in the first McKell ministry, and Minister for Education in the second McKell ministry, and in the first, second, and third ministries of Jim McGirr, and then the first, second, third and fourth ministries of Joseph Cahill. Heffron served as Deputy Premier to Cahill between 1953 and 1959 until Cahill died in office on 22 October 1959. The following day, Heffron was elected as Labor Leader and became Premier, retaining Cahill's ministry intact. He had been narrowly been defeated in by McGirr in the leadership ballot in 1947. Issues during this ministry were the appointment of H. V. Evatt as Chief Justice of New South Wales, an appointment that was widely seen as a means of giving him a dignified exit from politics. Reg Downing, the Attorney General, refused to move the nomination in cabinet and the nomination was narrowly passed, 8 to 6. The ministry also proposed to abolish the Legislative Council of New South Wales, however the 1961 referendum was rejected, with only 42.4% support.

This ministry covers the period from 28 October 1959 until 14 March 1962, when Heffron led Labor to victory at the 1962 state election.

Composition of ministry

The composition of the ministry was announced by Premier Heffron following his appointment as Premier on 23 October 1959, and covers the period until 14 March 1962, when the 1962 state election was held.

 
Ministers are members of the Legislative Assembly unless otherwise noted.

See also

Notes

References

 

! colspan="3" style="border-top: 5px solid #cccccc" | New South Wales government ministries

New South Wales ministries
1959 establishments in Australia
1962 disestablishments in Australia
Australian Labor Party ministries in New South Wales